Serafin Geronimo: Ang Kriminal ng Baryo Concepcion is a 1998 Philippine action crime film written and directed by Lav Diaz on his directorial debut. The film stars Raymond Bagatsing as the title role.

The film is streaming online on YouTube.

Cast
 Raymond Bagatsing as Serafin Geronimo
 Tonton Gutierrez as Sarge
 Angel Aquino as Elvira Camandero
 Ana Capri as Estella
 Dindi Gallardo as Marietta
 Raymond Keannu as Dionisio
 Richard Joson as Miguel
 Lawrence David as Antonio
 Lorli Villanueva as Bella
 Dessa Quesada  as Nitz
 Joe Gruta as Ponso
 Jomar Roldan as Antonio
 Francis Flores as Quintin 
 Horacio Mendoza as Ace

Awards

References

External links

Full Movie on Regal Entertainment

1998 films
Filipino-language films
Philippine action films
Regal Entertainment films
Films directed by Lav Diaz